The Native American Housing Assistance and Self-Determination Act of 1996 (NAHASDA) simplifies and reorganizes the system of providing housing assistance to federally recognized Native American tribes to help improve their housing and other infrastructure. It reduced the regulatory strictures that burdened tribes and essentially provided for block grants so that they could apply funds to building or renovating housing as they saw fit. This was in line with other federal programs that recognized the sovereignty of tribes and allowed them to manage the funds according to their own priorities. A new program division was established at the Department of Housing and Urban Development (HUD) that combined several previous programs into one block grant program committed to the goal of tribal housing.  The legislation has been reauthorized and amended several times since its passage.

History 
NAHASDA was one result of the broader historic campaign in the 20th century for Native American self-determination and the tribes regaining sovereignty.

Prior to NAHASDA, housing assistance for Native American tribes and Alaska Natives was provided by several different programs under the Housing Act of 1937 and other related, succeeding legislation. These programs included assistance for Indian housing development, public housing projects, child development, rental assistance, youth program assistance, and housing assistance for the homeless. 
 
The programs greatly increased the quantity and quality of housing on Indian lands, but they had a variety of regulatory requirements, including separate application for grants and differing standards for eligibility; they required different obligations from the tribes. In addition, under these programs, public housing assistance on Indian reservations was considered an extension of other housing programs, and did not recognize the unique cultural and infrastructure needs of Native American communities, which were usually located in rural areas.  Roger Biles describes how "The clustered housing prescribed for rental units clashed with the traditional living patterns of many Indians and, according to some IHA officials, resulted in the creation or exacerbation of problems previously rare in Native American populations such as gangs, violence, and drug and alcohol abuse." These issues caused friction between HUD administrators and tribal leaders. A series of investigations in the 1990s also uncovered instances of corruption, fraud, and mismanagement.

Although the tribes had relied on federal housing assistance programs for decades, the programs were cumbersome to implement and many of their people on reservations still suffered from inadequate housing and homelessness, some resulting from the widespread poverty due to lack of jobs on reservations.  As these issues were studied, tribal leaders, advocates, and elected officials such as Rep. Bill Richardson (D-NM), began calling for the promotion of "a creative new approach that encourages tribes to take control of their own futures [that] would also get them out from under the [Bureau of Indian Affairs]." This was part of a late 20th-century movement stressing increased sovereignty and self-determination of tribes in many areas of self-government.

On June 26, 1994, HUD released a new American Indian and Alaska Native policy statement, emphasizing its intent to strengthen the unique government-to-government relationship between the U.S. and federally recognized Native American tribes and Alaska Native villages by encompassing Indian affairs as part of their sphere of responsibility. Traditionally, issues concerning Native Americans had been addressed by the Bureau of Indian Affairs and the U.S. Department of the Interior; the policy statement sought to expand HUD's mission to include a special responsibility to Indian tribes.

The memorandum was the basis for the Native American Housing Assistance and Self-Determination Act (NAHASDA), which established grant and support programs specifically for the use of American Indian and Alaska Native groups. NAHASDA was introduced in the U.S. House of Representatives by Rep. Rick Lazio (R-NY) on March 29, 1996  as H.R. 3219.

In his remarks, Rep. Lazio said, 

Tribal governments and housing authorities should also have the ability and responsibility to strategically plan their own communities' development, focusing on the long-term health of the community and the results of their work, not over burdened by excessive regulation. Providing the maximum amount of flexibility in the use of housing dollars, within strict accountability standards, is not only a further affirmation of the self-determination of tribes, it allows for innovation and local problem-solving capabilities that are crucial to the success of any community-based strategy.

On September 28, 1996, Rep. Lazio moved to suspend the House rules and pass the bill as amended; the bill was agreed to by voice vote without objections.  The bill then moved on to the U.S. Senate, where it was swiftly passed by unanimous consent on October 3. On October 26, 1996, U.S. President Bill Clinton officially signed NAHASDA into public law.

Summary of the Act 

NAHASDA was designed to recognize the unique relationship and history of the United States and the sovereign American Indian nations. It was intended to address the need of affordable housing on tribal lands for low income people and families as part of the federal government's responsibility to promote the general well being of the country: 

The act is separated into seven sections:
Title I: Block Grants and Grant Requirements
Title II: Affordable Housing Activities
Title III: Allocation of Grant Amount
Title IV: Compliance, Audits, and Reports
Title V: Termination of Assistance for Indian Tribes Under Incorporated Programs
Title VI: Federal Guarantees for Financing for Tribal Housing Activities
Title VII: Other Housing Assistance for Native Americans

The act simplified the system of providing housing assistance to Native American communities by consolidating the myriad programs previously available to tribal groups into a single grant program known as the Indian Housing Block Grant (IHBG). Title VI of the act also authorized loans and loan guarantee programs to help American Indian tribes finance their development projects.

NAHASDA created a transition from funding and regulation under the Housing Act of 1937, so that all grants awarded under the previous legislation were renewable only if in compliance with the new law.  This new act was designed specifically to assist in the development of housing, housing services, housing management services, and crime prevention and safety activities in Indian communities.  These actions are meant to align with the objectives of assisting and promoting affordable housing on tribal land, offering tribal members better access to private mortgage markets, matching development to surrounding areas, and promoting private capital markets Indian Country.

To receive grants through this program both a one- and a five-year plan are required to be submitted by the tribes. They must include a mission statement, list of goals and objectives, an activities plan, a statement of needs, financial resources, and of affordable housing resources, and a certification of compliance.  Once funds have been awarded, grantees must meet a standard of wages, comply with the National Environmental Policy Act of 1969, keep rents at or below 30% of the resident's monthly adjusted income, set eligibility requirements for admission, and secure a management group that efficiently maintains and operates the units.

Any profits made from the development of the affordable housing must be used by the tribe for further development of similar housing operated under NAHASDA.  Funds may also be invested, but annual reports and audits are required to ensure that grant money is being used to invest in the promotion of self-sufficiency and housing in Indian communities.  The tribes submit yearly reports along with the government's review. The amount of outstanding obligations for NAHASDA can not exceed $2,000,000,000.  If a recipient fails to meet the requirements and abide by the regulations, the recipient can be replaced by another applicant.  The initial allocation of funds is decided by a formula used to determine need.  When first administered in 1997, this amount could not be less than any funds received during the fiscal year of 1996.

Included in the legislation are tenant rights to notification of eviction and just cause for eviction, applicable to all housing funded through the Act.  Another stipulation for future projects aligns with the Public and Assisted Housing Drug Elimination Act of 1990, and drug activity is a valid cause for eviction.

Assistance to Native Hawaiians 

An amendment to the act in 2000 added Title VIII, which authorizes loans for housing and infrastructure purposes by Native Hawaiians.  The authorization prompted some non-indigenous Hawaiians to file suit against the Office of Hawaiian Affairs (OHA) in the case Arakaki v. Lingle.  The plaintiffs claimed that the authorization of HUD grant money for sole use of indigenous people was in violation of the equal protection clause of the 14th Amendment.  On April 16, 2007, the District Court ruled in favor of the OHA, claiming that the authorization of grants to the OHA did not constitute any harm to the plaintiffs. This set a precedent for the constitutionality of the government's supplying funds to Native groups for them to use as they see fit.

Implementation and impact 

Made effective September 1, 1997, NAHASDA  distributed $550 million  in grants of its allocated $592 million  within its first year; 97 percent of tribal housing entities met the first housing plan submission deadline of July 1, 1998.  NAHASDA doubled the number of tribes receiving grants, compared to the previous collection of HUD grants it replaced. The number of housing units developed or planned by Native Americans per year was tripled compared to the yearly average during the lifetime of the 1937 Housing Act.

In keeping with the related goal of self-determination, tribes were permitted to use Indian Housing Block Grants for a wide range of purposes.  For example, tribes used some grant money to rehabilitate existing housing units and construct new units.  According to a Government Accountability Office (GAO) study, "During fiscal years  2003 through 2008, NAHASDA grantees collectively used IHBG funds to  build 8,130 homeownership and 5,011 rental units; acquire 3,811 homeownership and 800 rental units; and rehabilitate 27,422 homeownership and 5,289 rental units". With regard to alleviating poverty and making housing more affordable for Native Americans, tribes could use grants for various housing assistance programs.  For example, the same GAO study reports that "in fiscal years 2008 and 2009, approximately 50 percent of grantees used IHBG funds to provide tenant-based rental assistance; more than 50 percent used IHBG funds to provide housing or financial literacy counseling; and approximately 30 percent used IHBG funds to provide down payment assistance".

NAHASDA has contributed to improving relations between the federal and tribal governments. A GAO survey found that the act and its implementation were well regarded among Native Americans: 89.7% of respondents held positive views toward the effectiveness of NAHASDA, while less than 10% felt it was not an improvement over the previous Indian housing programs.  The most highly regarded aspect of the plan was the level of discretion afforded to the tribes to determine their own needs.  The act recognized that the policies HUD applied to providing public housing in poor urban neighborhoods might not be effective on rural Native American reservations. In addition, NAHASDA "simplified the [application] process for federal housing money and reduced friction with housing authorities seen in earlier programs". The widely perceived success of the program and its broad political support led to its reauthorization in 2001 and 2008. The act expired in 2013. Congress has continued to allocate funding on a year to year basis. Reauthorization bills have been introduced in every Congress since 2013 and have repeatedly failed.

Current figures
Indian Country Today reported on the program in 2016:
The money is allocated to tribes based on a formula, and goes to their tribally-designated housing entities (TDHEs). The biggest allocation for 2016 is to the country's largest tribe, the Navajo Nation. The Arizona-based Navajo will receive $86.4 million in IHBG money for fiscal 2016. Other large allocations go to the Cherokee Nation of Oklahoma ($30 million), Cook Inlet Regional Corp. of Anchorage, Alaska ($6 million) and $5.9 million to the Muscogee Creek Tribe of Oklahoma.

Notes

References 
 Arakaki v. Lingle, 477 F. 3d 1048 - Court of Appeals, 9th Circuit 2007 
 Biles, Roger. 2000. "Public Housing on the Reservation." American Indian Culture and Research Journal 24 (2): 49–63.
 Cortelyou, G. H. "An Attempted Revolution in Native American Housing: The Native American Housing Assistance and Self-Determination Act". Seton Hall Legislative Journal 25, no 2 (2001): 429–68.
 Department of Hawaiian Homelands. "About the NAHASDA Community Grant Program." http://hawaii.gov/dhhl/nahasda
 Government Accountability Office. Native American Housing: Tribes generally view block grant program as effective, but tracking of infrastructure plans and investments needs improvement. Washington: Government Accountability Office, 2005. (GAO-10-326). http://www.gao.gov/products/GAO-10-326
 Hon. Rick Lazio, Extension of Remarks Congressional Record, 104th Congress, March 29, 1996
 Housing Act of 1937, 42 U.S.C. 1437
 "Native American Housing Assistance And Self-Determination Act Of 1996." (P.L. 104—330), U.S. Statutes at Large, 110 Stat. 4016. ; also 
 "Senator seeks to end grants for Indian tobacco stores," The New York Times, March 6, 2000 
 Richardson, Bill. OPED: "More power to the tribes," New York Times, July 7, 1993, A15.
 Rumbelow, H., & Writer, W. P. S. "Dreaming of homes on the reservation; act improves housing, but disputes remain," The Washington Post, October 13, 2002, A03.
U.S. Department of Housing and Urban Development. "Americand Indian and Alaska Native 1994 Policy Statement."  June 26, 1994.  

Indigenous politics in North America
United States federal Native American legislation